In My Head may refer to:

Albums
 In My Head (album), a 1985 album by Black Flag
 In My Head, a 1989 album by Robert Lamm

Songs
 "In My Head" (Ariana Grande song), 2019
 "In My Head" (CNBLUE song), 2011
 "In My Head" (Jason Derulo song), 2009
 "In My Head" (Juice Wrld song), 2022
 "In My Head" (Lil Tjay song), 2022
 "In My Head" (Loreen song), 2013
 "In My Head" (Madcon song), 2013
 "In My Head" (Queens of the Stone Age song), 2005
 "In My Head", a song by Kiss from Carnival of Souls: The Final Sessions
 "In My Head", a song by No Doubt from Rock Steady
 "In My Head", a song by Underground Lovers from Rushall Station
 "In My Head", a song by White Town from Peek & Poke
 "In My Head", a song by Your Vegas from A Town and Two Cities, 2008